War Museum of Chania was a museum in Chania, Crete, Greece, annex of the War Museum of Athens. It was founded in July 1995. The museum exhibited photographs, war artifacts and other items from the national wars and revolutions of the Greek History. It was housed in a building, built in 1870 and designed by the Italian architect Makouzo, which in the past had been used as barracks by the Italian Army during World War II.
On 7 Oct 2015 it was closed up and appeared to have been in this state for some time. There were no notices to say if the exhibitions had been moved elsewhere. On 22 July 2018, at 21:30 in the evening a fire broke out inside under unclear conditions. The building was completely destroyed, with no exhibits in place after being moved after an earthquake that had caused static problems in the building.

See also 
Athens War Museum
War Museum of Thessaloniki

References

External links 
Information Website of the Athens War Museum
www.crete-kreta.com

Chania
Museums established in 1975
Museums in Chania